Fireflight is an American Christian rock band formed in Eustis, Florida in 1999. The band was signed by Flicker Records. 

The band currently consists of Dawn Michele, Glenn and Wendy Drennen and Justin Cox (who left in 2013 but rejoined in 2019). They have released seven studio albums and has played in tours including ShoutFest, Revelation Generation and Winter Jam. They have also been featured on The Scars Remain tour with Disciple, Family Force 5, and Decyfer Down. Their fourth full-length album For Those Who Wait (2010) was nominated in the 2011 Grammy Awards.

Their most recent album, Who We Are: The Head and the Heart, was released in October 2020.

History
Guitarists Justin Cox and Glenn Drennen had gone to school together. Glenn had the idea to start a band with his wife Wendy (bassist) and Justin. They were then in need of a singer. Glenn and Wendy went to Glenn's younger brother's graduation and heard Dawn Futch (later Dawn Michele) (lead singer) singing during the graduation service; they asked her to be in the group and she agreed to it. The band was looking for a drummer at this point, and through a mutual friend they met Phee Shorb, who agreed to play drums.

The name "Fireflight" was suggested by Dawn Michele shortly before they did a small performance at a church. The name Fireflight has no meaning, as suggested by the band in an interview with Jesus Freak Hideout.

They independently released the album Glam-rök, which was produced by guitarist Justin Cox, in 2002. They followed it up with the five-track EP On the Subject of Moving Forward in 2004 before they were signed to the major record label Flicker Records.

After years of touring (it is estimated they play 140 shows every year), they released their major label debut album The Healing of Harms in 2006 with two No. 1 singles "You Decide" and "Waiting."
The album was a hit, peaking at No. 37 on Billboard magazine's Top Christian Albums chart. The song "You Decide," featuring Josh Brown of Day of Fire, was the top request at TVU music television in August 2006. It was the second most played song on Christian Rock radio stations according to the September 1, 2006, R&R magazine airplay chart, No. 11 on the R&R Christian Hit Radio charts on October 23, 2006, and No. 1 on the Christian Radio Weekly chart. On Billboard's chart, it peaked at No. 27 on the Hot Christian Singles chart and it finished in the Top 25 of 2006 for the network radio station Air1.

Their second single to rock radio, "Waiting," had reached No. 1 R&R and CRW Christian Rock chart, and stayed there for 3 consecutive weeks during the month of February 2007. They concurrently released the songs "It's You," "Star of the Show," and "Attitude" to Christian Hit Radio stations.

During another extensive year of touring, the band was experiencing an emotional roller coaster while writing their album "Unbreakable." Dawn describes on their MySpace how stressful and intense writing the album was:

"It almost felt like things were out of control," says Dawn. "We'd gone through a difficult year as a band with a lot of emotional ups and downs. We basically lived together in a van while writing the new album, and that put us in a pressure cooker. All the stresses were magnified because you're completely out of your comfort zone, and it really does crank up the intensity of the writing. We poured all of our hope, sorrow, anger, dreams and fears into the music."

Fireflight debuted clips of its single "Unbreakable" in promos for the new Bionic Woman television series. "Unbreakable" is the title song from their album released in March 2008. The single rose to the number one spot on CRW and R&R's Christian Rock charts seven weeks after its release. The band's third number one rock song was the most added song on Christian Hit Radio radio stations in February 2008. It ended 2008 as the 14th most-played song Christian CHR radio according to R&R magazine's Christian CHR chart.
The band played at Winter Jam 2010.

Fireflight's fourth full-length album entitled For Those Who Wait was released on February 9, 2010. They shot music videos for both "For Those Who Wait," which came out June 1 on their official YouTube channel, and the lead single "Desperate." "Desperate" was unveiled on February 9, 2010, to coincide with the release of the new album. The album has peaked at No. 5 on Billboard Hot Christian Albums, and is their highest charting CD. Desperate was once a No. 1 single on christianrock.net and on BDSradio.com's Christian Rock chart, and it peaked at No. 3 on the Christian CHR chart on the same website. The next single to be released was "For Those Who Wait." The video for the title track was released in May. On November 25, 2010, Fireflight's band trailer was stolen. It contained approximately $80,000 worth of equipment and merchandise. FireFlight was nominated for Best Rock/Rap Gospel Album for the 53rd Grammys; they lost to Switchfoot. In February 2011, The band's original drummer Phee Shorb left the band to become a Christian speaker; he was replaced by Adam McMillion.

The band released their fifth album, Now, on March 6, 2012, which became their most chart topping album, and fastest selling, reaching No. 1 on the Contemporary Christian Charts. Its leading track, "Stay Close" was released in the Winter Jam Tour 2011. They released a music video for "Stay Close" on YouTube on their official Vevo account. The album has sold more than 40,000 copies as of July 15, 2012.

In early 2014, Fireflight announced that they had asked and been granted a release from their recording contract and were launching a Pledgemusic campaign to raise money for their sixth studio album, to be released independently. On June 25, 2014, it was revealed that the title of the new album would be titled Innova. On September 5, 2014, it was announced that Innova would be released May 5, 2015. On March 3, 2017, they released RE•IMAG•INNOVA, an EP with reimagined selections from Innova.

Guitarist Justin Cox rejoined the group in 2019. Seventh album, Who We Are: The Head and the Heart, released on October 23, 2020.

Band members
Current members
 Dawn Michele – lead vocals (1999–present)
 Wendy Drennen – bass guitar, backing vocals (1999–present)
 Glenn Drennen – rhythm guitar (1999–present)
 Justin Cox – lead guitar, backing vocals, keyboard (1999–2013, 2019–present)

Former members
 Phee Shorb – drums (1999–2011)
 Adam McMillion – drums (2011–2015, 2020)

Discography

 Glam-rök (2002)
 The Healing of Harms (2006)
 Unbreakable (2008)
 For Those Who Wait (2010)
 Now (2012)
 Innova (2015)
 Who We Are: The Head and the Heart (2020)

Music videos

The video for the song "For Those Who Wait" was nominated for a Dove Award for Short Form Music Video of the Year at the 42nd GMA Dove Awards.

Awards

GMA Dove Awards

Grammy Awards

References

External links
 
 Exclusive Interview with Dawn of Fireflight

1999 establishments in Florida
American post-grunge musical groups
Christian rock groups from Florida
Christianity in Orlando, Florida
Essential Records (Christian) artists
Flicker Records artists
Musical groups established in 1999
Musical groups from Orlando, Florida
Musical quintets
Female-fronted musical groups